Mount Marzolf is an elongated partially ice-free mountain standing at the head of Svendsen Glacier,  west of Mount Gillmor, in the Usarp Mountains of Antarctica. It was mapped by the United States Geological Survey from surveys and U.S. Navy air photos, 1960–65, and was named by the Advisory Committee on Antarctic Names for John E. Marzolf, a United States Antarctic Research Program geologist at McMurdo Station, 1967–68.

References

Mountains of Oates Land